The men's halfpipe event in freestyle skiing at the 2014 Winter Olympics in Sochi, Russia took place 18 February 2014. In April 2011 freestyle halfpipe was added to the Olympic program, meaning the event will make its debut.

Results

Qualification
The qualification was held at 17:45.

Final
The final was held at 21:30.

References

Men's freestyle skiing at the 2014 Winter Olympics